Vey or Veys may refer to:

People
Gary Vey, Canadian politician
Lana Vey (born 1984), Canadian curler
Linden Vey (born 1991), Canadian ice hockey player
P. C. Vey, American cartoonist

Places
Le Vey, Calvados, Normandy, France; a French commune
Les Veys, Manche, Normandy, France; a French commune
Vey, Iran, a village
Veys, Veys District, Bavi, Khuzestan, Iran; a city
Veys Rural District, Veys District, Bavi, Khuzestan, Iran
Veys District, Bavi, Khuzestan, Iran

Other uses
 Vestmannaeyjar Airport (IATA airport code: VEY; ICAO airport code: BIVM) Iceland

See also

Oy vey, a Yiddish phrase
McVey (surname)
Vay (disambiguation)
Vea (disambiguation)